Krnjeuša (Serbian Cyrillic: Крњеуша) is a village in the municipality of Bosanski Petrovac, Bosnia and Herzegovina.

Demographics 
According to the 2013 census, its population was 495.

See also
Pogrom in Krnjeuša

References

Populated places in Bosanski Petrovac
Serb communities in the Federation of Bosnia and Herzegovina